The 76th Street station was a local station on the demolished IRT Third Avenue Line in Manhattan, New York City. It was originally built on December 9, 1878. The outer tracks served local trains and it had two side platforms. The center track was built as part of the Dual Contracts and was served by express trains. This station closed on May 12, 1955, with the ending of all service on the Third Avenue El south of 149th Street.

References

76th Street Station on the 3rd Avenue El (NYCSubway.org)
3rd Avenue El (StationReporter.net)

IRT Third Avenue Line stations
Railway stations in the United States opened in 1878
Railway stations closed in 1955
1878 establishments in New York (state)
1955 disestablishments in New York (state)
Former elevated and subway stations in Manhattan
Third Avenue